Stephen Close (1374–1472) was Archdeacon of Carlisle from 1452 until 1570.

HClose was educated at King's Hall, Cambridge. He held livings at Banham, Ousby, Bugbrooke and Great Salkeld.

References

Archdeacons of Carlisle
15th-century English people
Alumni of King's Hall, Cambridge